Oriental Institute of Science & Technology (OIST) is a private engineering college located in Bhopal, Madhya Pradesh, India, owned by the private group "Oriental Group of Institutes". It is affiliated with the Rajiv Gandhi Proudyogiki Vishwavidyalaya.

The institutes of the group are only located in Bhopal, Indore, and Jabalpur. The institutes of Bhopal and Jabalpur campus are affiliated to Rajiv Gandhi Proudyogiki Vishwavidyalaya (RGPV), Bhopal while the institutes of Indore campus are affiliated to Oriental University (OU), Indore.

It admits students through JEE/PET/AIEEE/MAT/Pre-MCA and counseling conducted by the State Universities and MHRD. It offers courses in Computer Science and Engineering (CSE), Information Technology (IT), Electronics and Communication (EC), Electrical and electronic engineering, Automotive engineering, Mechanical Engineering (ME), Civil engineering, and MCA (Masters in Computer Application). In 2020, two new branches were added - BTech in CSBS (Computer Science and Business System) and BTech in Artificial Intelligence and Data Science.

Admissions
For the undergraduate course, the admission is through the national-level engineering entrance examination: JEE-Mains or Qualifying Exam (XII). For the postgraduate courses, the institute claims that entry is through GATE for MTech, NIMCET for MCA or through an institute-conducted entrance test.

Training & placement
The institute started campus placement from its first batch in 1998. Major recruiters include TCS, Cognizant, Infosys, Tech Mahindra, Wipro, Capgemini, Syntel, L&T Infotech, Avaya, US Technologies, Zensar, Mu Sigma, Amdocs, UST Global, Zycus, Yodlee, Sears Holdings, Persistent Systems, Aon Hewitt, Mphasis, Atos, etc., Students in Computer Science / Information Technology get placed in TCS, Wipro and Infosys and other branches have very few placement ratio.

Shooting of movies
The shooting of Prakash Jha's movies Rajneeti and jai lava kusa was done in its campus. 300 students of the institute were part of the movie Aarakshan.

See also
List of educational institutions in Bhopal

References

External links
 

Engineering colleges in Madhya Pradesh
Universities and colleges in Madhya Pradesh
Universities and colleges in Bhopal
Education in Bhopal